Felix Navarro (born 1936) is a sports shooter who represents the United States Virgin Islands. He competed in the mixed skeet event at the 1976 Summer Olympics.

References

1936 births
Living people
United States Virgin Islands male sport shooters
Olympic shooters of the United States Virgin Islands
Shooters at the 1976 Summer Olympics
Place of birth missing (living people)